Carole Spiers is a British entrepreneur, public speaker and author best known for her work in the field of stress management, counselling and employee wellbeing.

Career
Spiers is the founder and CEO of the Carole Spiers Group, an international Stress Management Employee Counselling consultancy working mainly in the contrasting cultures of UK and the Middle East. She is a RELATE trained counsellor and post-trauma debriefer in addition to acting as an Expert Witness before the UK courts.

Spiers is Chair of The International Stress Management Association (UK), a registered charity and the lead professional body for workplace and personal Stress Management, Wellbeing and Performance. On their behalf, in 1999, she launched National Stress Awareness Day. She was also a member of the committee for the UK Government initiative 'Securing the Health of the Nation'.

Being an international motivational speaker Spiers delivers keynote addresses to conferences and seminars. From 2006–2008, she was the President of the London Chapter of the Professional Speaking Association.

In 2014, she was appointed Communications Partner for Mosaic, a charity founded by HRH Prince of Wales in 2007, who through its mentoring programmes, inspire young people from deprived communities, worldwide, to realise their talents and potential.

Spiers supports the UK Government Older Worker's Campaign whose remit is to provide help and support for older people who want to get back in, or stay in, work and employers who could benefit by employing older people.

Media work
Being the author of Tolley's Managing Stress in the Workplace and Show Stress Who's Boss!, which has been translated into Arabic and available in the United Arab Emirates and India. Spiers' clients include AstraZeneca, Costco, Commercial Bank of Dubai, Debenhams, Dubai Cables, Emirates Airlines, Gasco (Abu Dhabi), Givaudan, House of Fraser, Indesit, Ooredoo (Qatar) and Mubadala.

Spiers is a weekly business columnist for Gulf News, writing on stress-related issues facing Middle East management, and a past columnist for Khaleej Times. Her work has appeared in publications including HR Review, Stressbusting, and has been a guest broadcaster of programs discussing issues related to workplace stress and bullying on LBC, BBC, Studio One-Dubai, CNN and BBC Radio. Spiers has also been interviewed or quoted in media including BBC and The Guardian.

Humanitarian work
During the former Yugoslavian Civil War in the 1990s, on behalf of the voluntary organisation Befrienders Worldwide, Spiers repeatedly visited Novi Sad to train humanitarian aid-workers in crisis intervention and post-traumatic stress, as well as counselling many refugees. She served as a Samaritan telephone crisis volunteer from 1979 – 2009 and visited prisoners in Wormwood Scrubs prison supporting their Listener scheme, a peer support service which aims to reduce suicide and self-harm in prisons. Since 2003, she has been working as a partner of the Dreamcatcher Foundation – South Africa working on the townships of South Africa's Southern Cape delivering micro-business training programmes and one to one coaching sessions to local entrepreneurs living in township communities by providing marketing expertise for those wishing to develop their own businesses in their local communities.

Selected bibliography

References

External links
  Carole Spiers Group Official site
 Professional Speaking Association
 International Stress Management Association

Living people
British writers
Year of birth missing (living people)